Baking, also known as "cooking", is a make-up technique originally used in Drag, now popularised by  celebrities and make-up artists. This technique includes applying a heavy amount of translucent powder under the eyes and on the high points of the face, including the 'T' zone, to set the base make-up. It is also used to extract oils from the face.

This technique can be used on a variety of different skin types and shades to highlight the under eye area and high points of the face such as the cheek bones, the bridge of the nose, the chin and the forehead. The effects of the powder are to soak up facial oils and to help the foundation melt into the skin. This prevents creasing in the baked areas while maximising coverage and longevity of the make-up to leave the face looking matte.

Background

Brief history 
The cosmetic technique of baking is a "very old make-up technique" that may be traced back to times such as Ancient Egypt and the early Elizabethian era.

The use of make-up can be traced back to times as early as Ancient Egypt. High class members of Egyptian society would use make-up to display their wealth, beliefs and positions within the community. Cosmetics were regarded as a symbol of high status and a sign of holiness and were often a major part of the burial ceremony along with jewellery.

Although Egyptians are renowned for heavy eye make-up, facial products were also used but were mainly focused on cheeks.

Despite the fact that make-up developed over time it remained an ideological concept of wealth and a display of class. In the lead up and throughout the early Elizabethan era cosmetics took aspects from Ancient Egypt and began to be used by actresses and prostitutes to define the face and eyes, however this was condemned by Queen Elizabeth I who described the type of dark make-up as "vulgar".

From the Renaissance up until the 20th century the lower classes predominately worked outside in jobs such as agricultural work, therefore, the stereotypical light-coloured British skin was darkened by exposure to the sun, this created the trend of 'pale faces' in mainland Europe. This type of cosmetic technique was used especially by royalty and the higher classes to segregate them from the poor. The whiter the complexion, the higher the class and nobility of the person. Consequently, why Queen Elizabeth I is famous for her pale skin.

Popularisation 
Baking was brought into the spotlight by celebrities such as Kim Kardashian whose make-up artist, Mario Dedivanovic uses the technique to set the famous Kardashian's make-up for events. He argues that this practice should not be used every day and he only uses it for celebrities that like "a very dramatic, long lasting, matte finish to the face" or if he is working on stage performers. This technique was also brought into light with the increased visibility of the drag community following the popular television show RuPaul's Drag Race. The technique of baking can be seen throughout the episodes when the queens are in the "work room" preparing for the runway. Baking is not just used for drag performers, it has been adopted by many make-up artists and is now used throughout special effects make-up to set bruising and cuts so that the products applied to the face melt in seamlessly and look as realistic as possible.

This technique was then popularised further by many bloggers and vloggers who have created videos and pages, teaching make-up enthusiasts and the general public how to bake or cook their face. This type of tutorial has taken over social media sites such as YouTube and Instagram, bringing baking into the mainstream as a new internet 'buzzword'. These such videos have gathered thousands of views, one of the most popular tutorials, by Heidi Hamoud, managed to gain over 2 million views since its upload in April 2015.

Someone who has taken this technique directly from the drag community, into the social media and make-up tutorial scene, is Miss Fame. A season 7 contestant on RuPaul's Drag Race, who is now planning a make-up tour where she plans to teach people the art of 'painting', a term used in the drag community to refer to 'making up'. Miss Fame features heavily on YouTube, not only with her own channel of tutorials and how to guides but also throughout other 'beauty gurus' channels where she 'paints' them and provides viewers with tips and tricks from the drag community.

Products and tools 
 Concealer (for the best results use a concealer lighter than the skin tone)
 Loose setting powder (ideally translucent)
 Beauty/make-up sponge
 Make-up brush (a fluffy brush)

Uses 
As seen above there are different ways in which one can bake the face. Jamie Greenberg, a make-up artist, said that baking falls under the umbrella of contouring, which includes highlighting and shading. Therefore, baking can be used alongside contouring as a non-shimmery form of highlighting to emphasize the higher points of the face. Paired with contouring, it can also work to give the illusion of definition. Baking directly underneath the contour on the cheekbones can create a more crisp and clean contour. Paired with a highlighter or a strobing cream or powder, baking can set a base for a highlight, as well as intensifying it.

Baking is used by many performers as it increases the longevity of the make-up, meaning it will not easily melt or rub off during performances. This technique is utilised by many make-up artists for celebrities and models as "a way to set your make-up when standing under hot lights", as it reduces the need for touch-ups. It also increases the coverage of the make-up giving a more poreless and flawless, matte finish to the face, something which works well for celebrities and performers especially when flash photography is being used.

Baking can also be used as a form of colour correction. People tend to get dark circles under their eyes, baking this area is said to reduce the appearance of dark circles as the light shade and brightness from the powder or concealer can counteract the darkness around the eyes. People often bake their under eyes to reduce dark circles and also to prevent creasing in their fine lines and wrinkles, especially in the under eye area. Although, many make-up artists argue that this is not a good technique for ageing skin.

Finally, make-up artists also use baking for practical reasons. For example, when applying eye shadow, they often bake under the eyes to catch any eye shadow that may fall down onto the face from its application, allowing the product to be easily brushed away with the excess powder.

References 

Cosmetics